São Pedro is a Portuguese civil parish, located in the municipality of Vila do Porto, in the Portuguese autonomous region of Azores. The population in 2011 was 841, in an area of 18.17 km². It consists of the localities Atafona, Alto do Nascente, Bananeiras, Canavais, Chão do João Tomé, Covões, Faneca, Feteiras de Baixo, Feteiras de Cima, Jogo, Outeiro, Paul de Baixo, Paul de Cima, Ribeira do Engenho, Roças, São Pedro, Trevina and Pilar.

History
The first recorded birth in this region, Margarida Afonso, occurred in the locality of Paul.

São Pedro was chronologically the fourth ecclesiastical parish to be created (in 1603), following the pastoral visit of the D. Jerónimo Teixeira Cabral, the Bishop of Angra. Its creation was confirmed by Philip II on 5 March 1611. The first seat of the parish was the Church of São Pedro, in the area of Pedras de São Pedro, which Gaspar Frutuoso referred to as one of four hermitages that existed, near the village, situated ahead of the Church of Santo Antão.

Philip III, by regal decree, on 4 April 1623, accepted the petition of the vicar and inhabitants in São Pedro, authorized a donation for the public works on the hermitage in Pedras de São Pedro, which were declared necessary, after the visit of then-Bishop Pedro da Costa.

This hermitage had served as the parish seat until 1698, the year that by virtue of its population increase, a new church was opened in the locality of Rosa Alta to serve the local population.

Due to the rich, fertile soils, São Pedro was always an agricultural centre, and basis for their economy. This allowed the continued prosperity of its signeurial holdings, and characterized by large manorhouses with their own chapels.

Architecture

Civic
 Fountain of São José

Religious
 Church of São Pedro
 Hermitage of Nossa Senhora da Fátima
 Hermitage of Nossa Senhora da Saúde
 Hermitage of Nossa Senhora da Monserrate
 Hermitage of Nossa Senhora do Pilar
 Império of the Holy Spirit of the Miracles

References

Notes

Freguesias of Vila do Porto